James Thomas Bowman  CBE (born 6 November 1941 in Oxford, England) is an English countertenor. His career spans opera, oratorio, contemporary music and solo recitals. In 2010 it was announced that he would give his last London concert in 2011 at the Wigmore Hall, although he would continue to give recitals outside the capital. A few years previously he retired from the Chapel Royal, St. James's Palace in London, after a decade of service.

Education
Bowman's background is in Anglican church music. He was educated at The King's School, Ely where he  began singing as a boy chorister at Ely Cathedral, progressing to become head chorister. After the traditional rest when his voice broke he returned as a bass but around 1959 gave his first public performance as a countertenor to a small school congregation in the Lady Chapel. He later went to New College, Oxford as an Organ Scholar and was a member of the New College and Christ Church choirs.

Opera
In 1967, while still a student, he auditioned for Benjamin Britten's English Opera Group.  He was cast as Oberon in A Midsummer Night's Dream, a part which had been composed with Alfred Deller's voice in mind: Bowman, who had a larger voice than Deller, went to have a long association with the part.
He appeared at Glyndebourne in 1970 in Francesco Cavalli's La Calisto (the first countertenor to sing there), at English National Opera in 1971 in Semele, and at the Royal Opera House, Covent Garden in 1972 in Taverner.  In 1973 he created the role of the "Voice of Apollo" in Britten's Death in Venice.

Bowman retired from the operatic stage to concentrate on concert work after having appeared at most of the world's major opera houses including La Scala, Milan; Amsterdam, Paris, Aix-en-Provence, Sydney, Verona, Vienna, Strasbourg, Santa Fe, Dallas, and San Francisco.

Non-operatic work

Early music
In 1967 Bowman made his London debut at the opening concert of the Queen Elizabeth Hall. The same year, he recorded for EMI records Ltd, with the Choir of King's College, Cambridge and the English Chamber Orchestra conducted by David Willcocks, the Charpentier's "Messe de Minuit" for Christmas H.9

In... Bowman met David Munrow and was invited to join the Early Music Consort of London. The ensemble flourished in the ten years 1967–1976, making numerous recordings and touring extensively.   After Munrow's death in 1976, the consort disbanded but Bowman continued to work with former members such as the harpsichordist and conductor Christopher Hogwood and the lutenist Robert Spencer.
During the late 1960s Bowman sang regularly with the choir of Westminster Abbey.

For many years Bowman was a member of the early music choral group Pro Cantione Antiqua.

Contemporary music
As well as the association with Britten mentioned above, he has given the world premieres of contemporary compositions by composers such as Geoffrey Burgon, Alan Ridout and Richard Rodney Bennett. 
He also commissioned the Self-laudatory hymn of Inanna and her omnipotence from Michael Nyman.

In recital he works frequently with the lutenist Dorothy Linell and the pianist Andrew Plant.

Accolades
In 1992 the French Government honoured him with admission to L'ordre des Arts et des Lettres and he was also awarded the Medal of Honour of the City of Paris, in recognition of his long-standing contribution to the musical life of that city.
Bowman is also President of the Holst Singers.
In May 1992 Bowman received the Honorary Degree of Doctor of Music from the University of Newcastle upon Tyne.
He was made a Commander of the Order of the British Empire in the Queen's Birthday Honours in June 1997.
 In November 1998 Bowman was made an Honorary Fellow of New College, Oxford.
 In December 2006, following the death of Sir Malcolm Arnold, Bowman was installed as Patron of the Northamptonshire Choral Foundation, and thus the Choirs of All Saints' Church, Northampton.
 He is a Vice-President of The Bach Choir.

Discography
Bowman has made over 180 recordings with all the major record labels and has also worked with many leading conductors including Nikolaus Harnoncourt, Frans Brüggen, Christopher Hogwood, David Willcocks, John Eliot Gardiner, Roger Norrington, and Gustav Leonhardt. Between 1988 and 2001 he made many recordings for Hyperion Records with The King's Consort and their conductor Robert King, including the complete odes of Henry Purcell, secular songs and church music, Handel Judas Maccabaeus, the Occasional Oratorio, Deborah, Joseph and his Brethren, Giulio Cesare, Ottone, and Joshua, discs of Schelle, Kuhnau and Knüpfer, and two solo discs of Handel arias.  Twentieth-century repertoire includes Vaughan Williams' Ten Blake Songs and "Linden Lea", on the Meridian Records label (CDE 84158).In 2011 James recorded Songs and sorrowful sonnets with Dorothy Linell ( Lutanist) on Maproom recordings. due out on digital 17/03/2023.

Solo recitals
Songs of Innocence, recital album with Andrew Swait (treble) and pianist Andrew Plant, Signum 2007

References

External links
 Bowman website

1941 births
Living people
Commanders of the Order of the British Empire
Operatic countertenors
English opera singers
Alumni of New College, Oxford
Fellows of New College, Oxford
Gentlemen of the Chapel Royal
British performers of early music
English male singers
People educated at King's Ely
Musicians from Cambridgeshire
Choral Scholars of New College, Oxford
Lay Clerks of New College, Oxford